The Liberty Legacy Foundation Award is an annual book award given by the Organization of American Historians (OAH).   The award goes to the best book written by a professional historian on the fights for civil rights in the United States anytime from 1776 to the present.  Dr. Darlene Clark Hine challenged American historians to research and write on those civil rights episodes taking place in the United States before 1954 in her 2002 OAH  presidential speech. A committee of three OAH members, chosen by the OAH president, make the selection. As of 2018, the committee chair is Paul Ortiz, with both Carol Anderson and Charles McKinney rounding out the committee. The Award Winner receives a monetary prize that ranges $1000 and $2000. In the Award's first year (2003), a single Winner and six Finalists were named. In 2004, two Winners were named. In 2006 and 2017, one Winner and one Honorable Mention were named for each year. In 2008, one Winner and two Finalists were named.

List of Award Winners
In the table below, the link on the "Author" is to the latest biographical site found. The link on the "Affiliation" is the author's workplace at the time of the award.

List of Award Finalists and Honorable Mentions

References

External links
Paul Ortiz Last viewed on June 11, 2018.
Carol Anderson Last viewed on June 11, 2018.
Charles McKinney Last viewed on June 11, 2018.
J. Mills Thornton Last viewed on March 9, 2011.
Greta de Jong Last viewed on March 9, 2011.
Jerald E. Podair Last viewed on March 9, 2011.
John D. Skrentny Last viewed on March 9, 2011.
Robert Rodgers Korstad Last viewed on march 9, 2011.
About Dr. Barbara Ransby Last viewed on March 9, 2011.
Nikhil Pal Singh Last viewed on March 9, 2011.
Matthew J. Countryman Last viewed on March 9, 2011.
Emilye Crosby Last viewed on March 9, 2011.
Thomas F. Jackson Last viewed on March 9, 2011.
Michael Honey Last viewed on March 9, 2011.
Kent Germany Last viewed on March 10, 2011.
Laurie Green Last viewed on March 10, 2011.
Chris Myers Asch with the U.S. Public Service Academy Last viewed on March 10, 2011.
Beryl Satter Last viewed on March 10, 2011.
Chad Williams Last viewed on June 11, 2018.
Tomiko Brown-Nagin Last viewed on June 11, 2018.
Andrew W. Kahrl Last viewed on June 11, 2018.
Susan D. Carle Last viewed on June 11, 2018.
N. B. D. Connolly Last viewed on June 11, 2018.
Tanisha C. Ford Last viewed on June 11, 2018.
Russell J. Rickford Last viewed on June 11, 2018.
Elizabeth Hinton Last viewed on June 11, 2018.
Ula Yvette Taylor Last viewed on June 11, 2018.

Awards established in 2003
History books about the United States
History of African-American civil rights
American literary awards